KTGB-LP was a low-power television station affiliated with The Inspiration Network, operating on UHF channel 26 in Lubbock, Texas.  The station owner was Jennifer Cremeens of Creemeens Broadcasting.

External links

Television stations in Lubbock, Texas
Defunct television stations in the United States
Television channels and stations disestablished in 2013
2013 disestablishments in Texas
TGB-LP